The British Rail Class 124 diesel multiple units were built by BR Swindon Works in 1960.

Operational history

The Class 124 was a class of initially six-car diesel multiple units used and built specifically for the trans-Pennine route. In the late 1970s, the class was merged with their Class 123 cousins that had been relocated from Reading services on the Western Region and, towards the end of their days, ran as 4-car hybrid sets. They were all withdrawn in 1984 when their duties were taken over by Class 31/4 diesel-electric locomotive-hauled rakes of four coaches.

Nine 2-car sets composed of a class 123 DMBSL and class 124 DMC were formed at Hull in 1984 in case introduction of the class 141 'Pacer' units was delayed, but they were never used in service.

The North Yorkshire Moors Railway had the idea of preserving at least one driving unit, due to the cab windows allowing panoramic views, but the plan was scrapped when it was found that the cost of removing the asbestos from the vehicle was prohibitive.

The class was not unique; the Class 124 DMUs shared mechanical components with their sister class 123, on the Western Region, and the Class 126.

'Wrap-around' windscreens were a feature that was also seen on the 'Glasgow Blue Train' Class 303 and 311 electric units; they were also seen on the GEML's Class 309s and the WCML's Class310s, although these were later modified to cut replacement costs.

Numbering

In later years when operating as 4-car units, the MBSL had their engines removed to reduce maintenance, as it was deemed two Motor Vehicles were adequate. To show this change the remaining MBSL were renumbered on removal of the engines.

Liveries

They were initially introduced in a green livery, but they never carried the common 'Whiskers' that many DMUs of the time carried. A small yellow panel was added at a later date to the cab front.

They ended their days in then standard BR blue/grey livery.

Technical details

 Builder: BR Swindon Works
 Introduced: 1960
 Coupling Code: Blue Square
 Body: 64 ft 6 in x 9 ft 3 in
 Engines: Leyland Albion 230 hp, 2 per power car
 Transmission: Standard mechanical

For coupling codes see British United Traction

References

Sources

Further reading
British Rail Fleet Survey 8: Diesel Multiple Units- The First Generation.  Brian Haresnape

External links

History of the Class 124s

124
Train-related introductions in 1960